The Riverland Football League is an Australian rules football league located in South Australia's Riverland region. The league has two divisions - the first division is for the main towns of the Riverland and the second division, called the Riverland Independent Football League, is for the minor towns. Their website is found at www.riverlandfootballleague.com.

History
The origins of this league was in 1909 when Lyrup, Renmark Town and Fairview Rovers founded the Murray Football Association.

The competition reformed in 1919 as the Upper Murray Football Association and later in 1952 became the Upper Murray Football League, the same name as the Upper Murray Football League based around Corryong, Victoria.

The league changed its name in 1972 to the Riverland Football League, with the league's second division changing from the Upper Murray B Grade Football League to the Riverland Independent Football League.

Season 1956 
Heavy rains further up river in NSW and Victoria caused the Murray River to flood and it caused the abandonment of the 1956 football season.

Season 2020 
Due to Covid-19, The RFL made the decision that "A" and "B" grade competitions would not go ahead. However, junior competitions still ran for the 2020 football season (U13's, U15's and U18's)

Current Clubs

VFL/AFL players

Grantley Fielke - 
Luke Jericho - 
Bruce Lindner - , 
Mark Mickan - , 
Tony Modra - , 
Mark Ricciuto - 
Troy Lehmann - , 
Alby Yeo - 
Tom Waye - 
Byron Schammer - 
Kaiden Brand - 
Peter Yeo - 
Russell Ebert - 
Damien Murray - 
Bradley Helbig - 
Bruce Tschirpig - 
Ron Battams - 
Rhys Stanley - , 
Wayne Thornborrow - 
Elkin Reilly - 
Jack Wade -

2000 Ladder

2001 Ladder

2002 Ladder

2003 Ladder

2004 Ladder

2005 Ladder

2006 Ladder

2007 Ladder

2008 Ladder

2009 Ladder

2010 Ladder

2011 Ladder

2012 Ladder

2013 Ladder

2014 Ladder

2015 Ladder

2016 Ladder

2017 Ladder

2018 Ladder

2019 Ladder

2020 Ladder (U18's)

2021 Ladder

References

External links
 Country footy Riverland footy news
 SANFL Affiliated Leagues 2006
 RFL League Website

Books
 Encyclopedia of South Australian country football clubs / compiled by Peter Lines. 
 South Australian country football digest / by Peter Lines 

Australian rules football competitions in South Australia
Riverland